The Decree on Land, written by Vladimir Lenin, was passed by the Second All-Russian Congress of Soviets of Workers' and Soldiers' Deputies on , following the success of the October Revolution.

It decreed an abolition of private property, and the redistribution of the landed estates amongst the peasantry. According to the Decree on Land, the peasants had seized the lands of the nobility, monasteries and Church. This decree was followed on February 19, 1918, by a decree of the Central Executive Committee of the All-Russian Congress of Soviets, "The Fundamental Law of Land Socialization". These decrees were amended by the 1922 Land Code.

Extracts

See also
Agriculture of the Soviet Union
Soviet Russia Constitution of 1918
Real property
Common good

Notes

External links 

 Decree on Land
 Declaration Of Rights Of The Working And Exploited People
 Full 1918 RSFSR Constitution

Official documents of the Russian Soviet Federative Socialist Republic
Land
1917 documents